Moses Melchior may refer to:

 Moses Melchior (1736–1817). Jewish Danish businessman
 Moses Melchior (1825–1912), Jewish Danish businessman

See also
 Moses & Søn G. Melchior